Silicon Saxony is a registered industry association of nearly 300 companies in the microelectronics and related sectors in Saxony, Germany, with around 40,000 employees. Many, but not all, of those firms are situated in the north of Dresden.

With a name chosen referring to Silicon Valley, the area and the union — in many aspects — represent the only meaningful European center of microelectronics. Many of those firms have very research and capital intensive business models competing with subsidized global players, mainly from Asia.

Industrial fields
The companies develop and produce computer calculation and memory chips or new materials and electronics for solar companies. The developed and produced small semiconductors chips are used in all kinds of cars, mobile phones, TV sets and so on.

History
Even before Germany's reunification, Dresden was a major center of microelectronics in the Eastern bloc with 3,500 employees. While mechanical engineering, which has a long history in the south of eastern Germany, suffered after the collapse of the Soviet Union, the microelectronics industry was, with public help from the state, one of the first industrial sectors in Saxony to recover. Although having many more employees today than before 1990, the sector is constantly under pressure because South Korea in particular is very keen to attract the industry. 

Saxony and Germany are however bound to the competition laws of the European Union, but was able to keep and expand most of the research parts of the industry that it had started with. These parts are seen as successful, but also as very risky whenever a larger company has serious problems because the sector demands a high concentration of resources to succeed.

Scientific environment
Dresden, as core-region of Silicon Saxony and yet without the headquarters of many of today's big companies, is nevertheless a very remarkable technology center with one large Technical University (German TU), ten other universities and most of all an unparalleled density of semi-public institutes of applied high-technologies in many fields (for example the Max Planck Society, Fraunhofer Society, Leibniz institutes, Helmholtz Association and other German academic elite institutions).

Members list

# 
3D Infotainment Technologies UG
3D-Micromac AG
4source electronics Aktiengesellschaft

A  
A. Greitner Gebäudereinigung + Service GmbH
ACCRETECH (Europe) GmbH
Actemium Controlmatic Gesellschaft für Automation und Elektrotechnik mbH
Adenso GmbH
ADG Automatisierung Dresden GmbH
advanced clean production Information Technology AG
advanced data processing GmbH
Advanced Mask Technology Center GmbH & Co.KG
ADZ NAGANO GmbH
AHC Oberflächentechnik GmbH
Air Liquide Electronics
Air Products GmbH
AIS Automation Dresden GmbH
ALLRESIST GmbH
alpha microelectronics
Alsco Berufsbekleidungs-Service GmbH
AMEC e.V.
Anvo-Systems Dresden GmbH
Applied Materials GmbH
aps Solutions GmbH
arias GmbH
ASML Germany GmbH
aSpect Systems GmbH
ASYS Automatic GmbH & Co. KG
ATEip
ATMEL Automotive GmbH
ATMI GmbH
ATT-Systems GmbH
AUMO GmbH
Avantgarde Labs GmbH
Axcelis Technologies GmbH
AZZURRO Semiconductors AG

B  
B.E.S.T. Fluidsysteme GmbH, Leipzig - Berlin
Bildungsbüro Hochtechnologie
BITKOM
Brenntag GmbH
Brooks Automation (Germany) GmbH
Brooks Instrument GmbH
Busch Semiconductor Vacuum Group B.V.
buschmais GbR
Businessplan - Wettbewerb Sachsen GmbH

C  
Cadence Design Systems GmbH
camLine Dresden GmbH
Carl Zeiss Innovationszentrum für Messtechnik
Cascade Microtech GmbH
Caterna GmbH
Centrotherm Clean Solutions GmbH & Co. KG
chip design
cleanpart Dresden GmbH & Co. KG
Cognex Germany
CommSolid GmbH
Communardo Software GmbH
Community ITsax.de
Compugraphics Jena GmbH
CONVANIT GbR
Creative Chips Dresden GmbH
Critical Manufacturing Deutschland GmbH
CS Clean Systems AG
CSS GmbH Dresden
CWE

D  
Danco Technik GmbH
DAS Environmental Expert GmbH
Dastex Reinraumzubehör GmbH & Co. KG
DEAXO GmbH
DELTA Mikroelektronik
DERU Planungsgesellschaft für Energie-, Reinraum- und Umwelttechnik mbH
Deutsche Solar GmbH
DevBoost GmbH
DFMSim Inc.
DIAS Infrared GmbH
Digades GmbH
DIS AG
DIW Mechanical Engineering GmbH & Co. KG
DMOS GmbH
docemos GmbH
Dockweiler AG
Dorfner KG
Dream Chip Technologies GmbH
DREEBIT GmbH
DREMICUT GMBH
Drescher, Prof. Kurt
dresden elektronik ingenieurtechnik gmbh
Dresden Informatik GmbH
DTF Technology GmbH
DUALIS GmbH IT Solution
Dynamic Micro Systems Semiconductor Equipment GmbH

E  
EBARA Precision Machinery Europe GmbH
edacentrum e.V.
EDC Electronic Design Chemnitz GmbH
Edwards GmbH
ELMOS Semiconductor AG
EMEC-Prototyping UG
Entegris GmbH
ERGO Umweltinstitut GmbH
esb Rechtsanwälte
etna GmbH; NL Sachsen
Eurogrant GmbH
Europäische Forschungsgesellschaft Dünne Schichten e.V.

F  
FAA Bildungsgesellschaft mbH, Südost
Fab Owners Association
Fachhochschule Lausitz
FAP GmbH Dresden
FCT Ingenieurkeramik GmbH
FHR Anlagenbau GmbH
Finetech GmbH & Co. KG
Fraunhofer COMEDD
Fraunhofer Technologiezentrum Halbleitermaterialien (THM)
Fraunhofer-Institut für Elektronenstrahl- und Plasmatechnik (FEP)
Fraunhofer-Institut für Elektronische Nanosysteme (ENAS)
Fraunhofer-Institut für Integrierte Schaltungen IIS
Fraunhofer-Institut für Keramische Technologien und Systeme (IKTS)
Fraunhofer-Institut für Photonische Mikrosysteme (IPMS)
Fraunhofer-Institut für Produktionstechnik und Automatisierung (IPA)
Fraunhofer-Institut für Werkstoff und Strahltechnik (IWS)
Fraunhofer-Institut für Zerstörungsfreie Prüfverfahren (IZFP)
Fraunhofer-Institut für Zuverlässigkeit und Mikrointegration (IZM)
Freiberg Instruments GmbH
Freiberger Compound Materials GmbH
Freiberger Silicium- und Targetbearbeitung GmbH
FRT, Fries Research & Technology GmbH
Fujifilm Electronic Materials (Europe) GmbH
Fäth GmbH

G  
Gesellschaft zur Förderung von Wissenschaft und Wirtschaft - GFWW - e.V.
Global Business Travel GmbH
GLOBALFOUNDRIES Dresden
Going International
Greentech Germany Innovative
Grundbesitz Hellerau GmbH
GWT-TUD GmbH

H  
Hager + Elsässer S-Tec GmbH
HAP GmbH Dresden
HEIMANN Sensor GmbH
Heliatek GmbH
Helmholtz-Zentrum Dresden-Rossendorf e. V.
high tech trade gmbh
HighQ-Factory GmbH
HighTech Startbahn (UG)
Hilbert, Dirk
Hilton Hotel Dresden
Hochschule für Technik und Wirtschaft Dresden (FH)
Horiba Europe GmbH
HPS Handels GmbH
HSEB Dresden GmbH

I  
I. K. Hofmann GmbH
i.S.X. Software GmbH & Co. KG
IBH IT-Service GmbH
Infineon Technologies Dresden GmbH
Infobroking Schwanecke Dresden
InnoLas Semiconductor GmbH
INNSIDE BY MELIA Dresden
InQu Informatics GmbH
Institut für Mikroelektronik- und Mechatronik-Systeme GmbH
Intel Mobile Communications Technology Dresden GmbH
Intelligente Sensorsysteme Dresden GmbH
interface systems gmbh
ION BEAM S.n.c
IP GEN Rechte GmbH
IQ Inspection & Qualification GmbH
itemic AG

J  
Junghans, Prof. Dr. Bernd

K  
Kamp, Hendrik
Kessler, Gerhard
Kinetics Germany GmbH
KLA-Tencor GmbH
KPMG AG Wirtschaftsprüfungsgesellschaft

L  
Landeshauptstadt Dresden
Landgraf-Dietz, Prof. Dieter
Leybold Optics Dresden GmbH
Linde Electronics GmbH & Co. KG
Lippert, Stachow & Partner

M  
M+W Integrated Solutions GmbH
Maicom Quarz GmbH
MAZeT GmbH
MCRT GmbH
me2c - [micro] electronic cluster
Melexis Dresden GmbH
memsfab GmbH
Mentor Graphics (Deutschland) GmbH
Mercateo AG
Mercuri Urval GmbH
MH Wassertechnologie GmbH
MICA - Management in Crisis Agency
MicroSystems GmbH
Minitron elektronik gmbh
MLP Finanzdienstleistungen AG
MPD Microelectronic Packaging Dresden GmbH
MSG Lithoglas GmbH
MunEDA GmbH
Murata Machinery GmbH - Dresden Branch

N  
NaMLab gGmbH
Nanium S.A.
newtron AG
Nikon Precision Europe GmbH
Novaled AG
NXP Semiconductors Germany GmbH

O  
OC Oerlikon Corporation  AG
OptoNet e. V.
Ortec Messe und Kongress GmbH
Ostsächsische Sparkasse Dresden
Overlack GmbH

P  
Pac Tech GmbH
PALL GmbH
Panalpina Welttransport (Deutschland) GmbH
PEER Group GmbH
Pfeiffer Vacuum GmbH
Pfennig Reinigungstechnik GmbH
Photronics MZD GmbH
PICOBELLO Dr. Hielscher Computerservice
Plasmetrex GmbH
Plastic Logic GmbH — Dresden
PMD Technologies AG
PR-Piloten GmbH & Co. KG
Prischmann, Dr. Werner
Productivity Engineering Gesellschaft für Prozessintegration mbH
profi-con GmbH
ProTec Carrier Systems GmbH

Q  
qfmd GmbH
Qoniac GmbH

R  
Rehak, Dr. Klaus
Rehak, Dr. Wolfgang
Reid Ashman Germany
ReinraumAkademie GmbH
RHe Microsystems GmbH
RoodMicrotec GmbH
Roth & Rau - Ortner GmbH
Roth & Rau AG
Rudolph Technologies Germany GmbH

S  
S-I-P GmbH
Sachsen Bank
Sachsen-Kälte GmbH
SALT Solutions GmbH
SAW COMPONENTS Dresden GmbH
Saxonia Bildungsinstitut
Saxonia Systems AG
Schenker Deutschland AG
Schloss Wackerbarth
Schneider + Partner GmbH
Scholpp Montagetechnik GmbH
SeeReal Technologies GmbH
Semisol Analytik GmbH
Semisystech S.r.l.
SEMPA SYSTEMS GmbH
SENTECH Instruments GmbH
Serma GmbH
SGS INSTITUT FRESENIUS GmbH
Siemens AG
Signalion GmbH
Silicon Micro Sensors GmbH
SILTECTRA GmbH
Siltronic AG
SMARTRAC TECHNOLOGY Dresden GmbH
Solarwatt AG
Solayer GmbH
SolMateS B.V.
SPEA GmbH
SPTS Technologies GmbH
SQL Projekt AG
sstCONSULT
STB Sachsenwind technische Beratungsgesellschaft mbH
Steigenberger Hotel de Saxe
SWAN Analytische Instrumente GmbH
Synopsys GmbH
SYSTEMA GmbH

T  
T-Systems Multimedia Solutions GmbH
T.I.P.S. Messtechnik GmbH
Tausch, Jürgen
TechnologieZentrumDresden GmbH
Teradyne GmbH
Tokyo Electron Europe Limited
Toppan Photomask Germany GmbH
TU Bergakademie Freiberg
TU Dresden, IAVT
TU Dresden, IHM
TU Dresden, Institut für Angewandte Informatik
TU Dresden, Institut für Angewandte Photophysik
TURCK duotec GmbH
tyclipso.net

U  
UniTemp GmbH

V  
VAT Deutschland GmbH
Viering, Jentschura & Partner
Vistec Electron Beam GmbH
Vocke, H. Unternehmensberatung
VON ARDENNE Anlagentechnik GmbH
von Selchow, Thilo
VOR Werbeagentur GmbH

W  
WAKU Robotics GmbH
Watlow GmbH
WBS TRAINING AG
Weiss Klimatechnik GmbH
WESSLING GmbH
Westsächsische Hochschule Zwickau - University of Applied Sciences Zwickau
Wirtschaftsförderung Sachsen GmbH
Woowon Technologies Ltd.
World Courier (Deutschland) GmbH

X  
X-Fab Semiconductor Foundries AG
XENON Automatisierungstechnik GmbH
xima media GmbH

Z  
Z&Z Werbeagentur
Zentrum für Mikrotechnologien (ZFM)
Zentrum Mikroelektronik Dresden AG
znt Zentren für Neue Technologien GmbH

See also 
 German Silicon Valley (disambiguation)

References

External links
Official website

Trade associations based in Germany
Information technology places
Dresden
Saxony
Technology trade associations
Science parks in Germany